Potiche is a 2010 comedy film written and directed by François Ozon, based on the play of the same name by Pierre Barillet and Jean-Pierre Gredy. It stars Catherine Deneuve, Gérard Depardieu, Fabrice Luchini, Karin Viard, Judith Godrèche and Jérémie Renier. Set in 1977, the film tells the story of a submissive wife who gets to run her husband's umbrella factory, after the employees rebel against their tyrannical manager. In French, a potiche  is a decorative vase, but by extension means "window dressing" or, roughly, "trophy wife". The film competed at the 67th Venice International Film Festival and received two Magritte Award nominations, winning Best Supporting Actor for Jérémie Renier.

Cast
 Catherine Deneuve as Suzanne Pujol
 Élodie Frégé as Young Suzanne
 Gérard Depardieu as Maurice Babin
 Fabrice Luchini as Robert Pujol
 Karin Viard as Nadège Dumoulin
 Judith Godrèche as Joëlle
 Jérémie Renier as Laurent Pujol
 Bruno Lochet as André Ferron
 Évelyne Dandry as Suzanne's sister

Production
François Ozon saw the play Potiche by Pierre Barillet and Jean-Pierre Grédy about ten years before he made the film. According to Ozon, the genesis of the film version was, partly, that he had been approached by the producers Éric and Nicolas Altmayer and asked to make a biographical film about Nicolas Sarkozy, and, partly, his experiences from the 2007 presidential campaign, where he followed the Socialist Party's candidate Ségolène Royal. While writing the screenplay, Ozon regularly met with Barillet, who gladly approved the tweaks made in order to enhance the story's relevance for contemporary society. The 1970s setting was, however, retained; this was both because the distance allowed the director to make a more humorous film, and because France was more politically divided in the 1970s, which made the class relations more remarkable. The political career of Suzanne was entirely Ozon's own addition to the story, which in its original incarnation ended when Robert returns to the factory.

The project was led by Mandarin Cinéma, with co-production support from Production Services Belgium. Principal photography took place in Belgium from 26 October 2009 and lasted eight weeks. The film was deliberately given a theatrical look in order to create distance and give the audience a constant awareness of watching a work of fiction. An important influence for the visual style was the cinema of Jacques Demy. The soundtrack includes Michèle Torr with "Emmène-moi danser ce soir", "Il était une fois", "Viens faire un tour sous la pluie" and Jean Ferrat's "C'est beau la vie".

Release
The film premiered on 4 September 2010 in competition at the 67th Venice International Film Festival. It was released in France and Belgium on 10 November. Launched in 440 prints through Mars Distribution, Potiche had 875,000 admissions during its first week in French theatres. At its peak the film was playing in 542 venues. When the theatrical run ended, the total number of tickets sold in France had reached 2,318,221. As of 28 June 2011, Box Office Mojo reported that the worldwide theatrical revenues of the film corresponded to 23,157,170 US dollars.

Overseas
A subtitled version in English was released on DVD in October 2011. Clips from the film were used in "trailers" subtitled by Orange, with all the dialogue reworded to be about mobile phones, in order to illustrate how phones can ruin a film.

Reception
On review aggregator website Rotten Tomatoes, the film holds an approval rating of 82%, based on 114 reviews, and an average rating of 6.7/10. On Metacritic, the film has a weighted average score of 68 out of 100, based on 31 critics, indicating "generally favorable reviews".

References

External links
  
 
 
 

2010 films
2010 comedy films
2010 LGBT-related films
2010s French-language films
Belgian comedy films
Belgian films based on plays
Belgian LGBT-related films
Films about labor relations
Films directed by François Ozon
Films set in 1977
Films set in France
Films shot in Belgium
French comedy films
French films based on plays
French LGBT-related films
French-language Belgian films
LGBT-related comedy films
2010s French films